Xīfèngjiǔ (Chinese: t , s ), also known as Xifeng liquor, is a type of baijiu distilled from sorghum and made from a barley and pea based qū starter. It is named from its production in Fengxiang County in Shaanxi.

Xifengjiu has relatively short period of fermentation when compared with other types of Bajiu, which is only two weeks.The aroma (Xiāng-Xíng, 香型 in Chinese) of Xifengjiu is a type of mixed aroma (Jiān-Xiāng-Xíng, 兼香型 in Chinese),which is a mixture of strong aroma (Nóng-Xiāng-Xíng, 浓香型 in Chinese) and light aroma (Qīng-Xiāng-Xíng, 清香型 in Chinese),with the former as the base armoa, and in 1992, its aroma was further classified to Feng aroma (Fèng-Xiāng-Xíng, 凤香型 in Chinese) otherwise known as Phoenix aroma.Despite winning several national awards, sales are mainly local, with 70% of the market limited to native Shaanxi province.

Reference

Chinese distilled drinks
Baijiu
Shaanxi cuisine